Francisco Amorós y Ondeano, otherwise known as the Marquis of Sotelo (19 February 1770 – 1848), contributed to gymnastics in France and to the resurgence of sport in the so-called modern world in general.

Ondeano was born in Valencia, Spain, the son of a brigadier of the Spanish army. At the age of nine he studied at a Saint-Isodore school within Madrid. At sixteen years of age he entered the military, in the capacity of an infantry-man in the army of Cordone.

Ondeano took French nationality during 1816 and opened a gymnasium in Paris during 1817, and another in 1820, for the use of the military and also the general population.

Amongst other works, he published texts entitled:

New Complete Manual of Physical Education for Gymnastics and Morals.
Civil (or Civilian) French Gymnasium (of which there was an edition in print during the year 1819)

See also
Thomas Arnold
 Johann Bernhard Basedow
William Penny Brookes
Pierre de Coubertin
Johann Christoph Friedrich GutsMuths
Georges Hébert
Pehr Henrik Ling

References

History of gymnastics
People associated with physical culture
1770 births
1848 deaths